Scilla peruviana, the Portuguese squill, is a species of Scilla native to the western Mediterranean region in Iberia, Italy, and northwest Africa. It is a bulb-bearing herbaceous perennial plant. The bulb is 6–8 cm in diameter, white with a covering of brown scales. The leaves are linear, 20–60 cm long and 1–4 cm broad, with 5-15 leaves produced each spring. The flowering stem is 15–40 cm tall, bearing a dense pyramidal raceme of 40-100 flowers; each flower is blue, 1–2 cm in diameter, with six tepals. The foliage dies down in summer, re-appearing in the autumn.

Name
Although the epithet peruviana means "from Peru", it is strictly a western Mediterranean species. Linnaeus named the species in 1753, citing an earlier name given to the plant by Carolus Clusius, Hyacinthus stellatus peruanus. Clusius mentioned the species as growing in the Antwerp garden of a certain Everardus Munichoven, who reportedly got the plants from Peru. The error was already mentioned in 1804 in Curtis's Botanical Magazine. There is no reliable source for the story about a ship named  'Peru', shipping plants from Spain to Northern Europe, misleading Clusius or Linnaeus into giving the erroneous name.

Cultivation and uses
It is commonly grown as an ornamental plant for its spring flowers; several cultivars are available ranging in colour from white to light or dark blue, or violet. In some areas it is also known as hyacinth-of-Peru, Cuban-lily, or Peruvian scilla.

It is not entirely hardy, suffering from prolonged frost. The best environment is a warm mediterranean climate similar to its native habitat.

References

Plants described in 1753
Taxa named by Carl Linnaeus
peruviana
Flora of Malta